Amy Joy Vine (born 22 December 1991) is an Australian cricketer who plays as a right-handed batter. She last played for Victoria in the Women's National Cricket League (WNCL). She made her Victoria debut on 9 November 2018 against the ACT Meteors. She made her maiden half-century on 5 February 2020, top-scoring with 56 in a three-wicket loss to the South Australian Scorpions.

References

External links

Amy Vine at Cricket Australia

1991 births
Living people
Cricketers from Melbourne
Sportswomen from Victoria (Australia)
Australian women cricketers
Victoria women cricketers